Weapon of Choice is a run and gun game developed by independent studio Mommy's Best Games and released on November 19, 2008.

Gameplay 
In the game, the player can select between seven "operatives", which are the characters controlled throughout the playthrough. The skills vary depending on the character chosen to play. If the character dies, another operative can be selected with a different set of skills. When all characters had died, the game finishes. The player is also able to rescue operatives lost in the field, unlocking them for future playthroughs of the game or, alternatively, rescue a fallen agent who's just been killed.

The character moves across large environments, sometimes with multiple paths, and destroys the environment and large amounts of monsters. The character is able to fire in any direction, jump, swap weapons, and activate a special mode.

Development 
Weapon of Choice was developed by Nathan Fouts, a former Insomniac Games programmer who worked on titles such as Resistance: Fall of Man and Postal 2. AJ Johnson wrote the dialog and the story, while Hamdija Ajanovic composed the game's soundtrack. the game was developed during the period of one year.

Reception 
Christopher Troilo from Avault gave the game three stars out of five, stating that "If you require something with a little more depth and thought, I still think you should give it a try, but that’s probably all you’ll need to satisfy your curiosity. Kieron Gillen from Eurogamer gave it a score of 7 out of 10, complimenting the graphic style as "hyperactive amateurish-yet-charming" and stating that it was "a run-and-gun that chooses to step back from the difficulty cliff and just show all the gleeful nonsense its managed to think up." He, as well as Troilo, compared the game with Contra. Brad Gallaway of GameCritic's praised the game saying its clear love of the genre it builds upon.

References

External links
Official site
Weapon of Choice at Xbox.com

2008 video games
Alien invasions in video games
Indie video games
Microsoft XNA games
Run and gun games
Video games about extraterrestrial life
Video games developed in the United States
Video games featuring female protagonists
Xbox 360 games
Xbox 360 Live Indie games